Mowa is a census town in Raipur district in the Indian state of Chhattisgarh.

Demographics
 India census, Mowa had a population of 130,697. Males constitute 53% of the population and females 47%. Mowa has an average literacy rate of 66%, higher than the national average of 59.5%: male literacy is 74%, and female literacy is 57%. In Mowa, 16% of the population is under 6 years of age.

References

Cities and towns in Raipur district